"The Absence of Field" is the third episode in the third season of the HBO science fiction dystopian thriller television series Westworld. The episode aired on March 29, 2020. It was written by Denise Thé, and directed by Amanda Marsalis.

Plot summary

In a flashback, the human Charlotte records a message and song for her son Nathan amid the host revolt in Westworld. Later, Dolores makes the Charlotte host body and inserts one of the host control units she smuggled out of Westworld, and explains to the unrevealed host that they must pretend to be Charlotte so they can run Delos to protect the few surviving hosts.

Caleb helps EMTs take Dolores to the hospital, but finds that people hired through the Rico app are following them. Caleb helps her fend them off, and as she drives away, she recommends Caleb go into hiding. Caleb goes to see his mother one last time, learning he has become a wanted target on Rico.

In the present, Charlotte learns Serac is buying up significant shares of Delos to acquire its data. She returns home and is scolded by her ex-husband Jake for forgetting to pick up their son Nathan from school. The next day, Charlotte is told assets are missing from the park, likely by an inside mole working for Serac. She starts to panic and arranges to meet with Dolores, who sees the host has been inflicting injuries on the body due to the strain of pretending to be someone else. As Dolores repairs them, Charlotte warns her about Serac.

Caleb is seized by two past associates who will kill him unless he tells them where Dolores is. As Dolores checks in with the host duplicate of Martin, she learns of Caleb's situation, and arrives to save him in time. Dolores brings Caleb to understand her plans for revolution, showing how much data Incite has on him and how Rehoboam has predicted his life will end in suicide in ten years, which is why he is stuck in menial jobs. She offers him another option, to join her revolution against Serac to pull the plug on Incite. Caleb agrees to help.

At Delos, Charlotte is given the human Charlotte's recording, and she remembers to pick up Nathan. There, she finds a pedophile trying to groom Nathan. She kills the pedophile. She continues to study the recording and recognizes the melody of "You Are My Sunshine" as matching tones she has received in phone messages. She uses them to unlock an unlisted number, which causes her vehicle to reroute itself to Serac's home. There, Serac demands all of the Delos' guest data that human Charlotte had promised and attempted to smuggle, but the host says she does not have the key for the encrypted data. Serac knows that key is within the host module of Dolores, and he tells Charlotte that she has little time left.

Music
An instrumental cover and original version of Moses Sumney's "Doomed" was played during the final scene and also the end credits for this episode.

Reception
"The Absence of Field" received highly positive reviews from critics. The episode has a 95% score on Rotten Tomatoes and has an average rating of 8.14/10, based on 21 reviews. The site's consensus reads: "Charlotte Hale's inner turmoil takes center stage in 'The Absence of Field', an episode that cleverly blurs the line between past and present, human and machine, and the two sides of a conflict that seemed all too clear so far."

The original live broadcast received 801,000 viewers, which was slightly up in viewership from the previous episode which had 778,000 viewers.

Notes

References

External links

  at HBO.com
 

2020 American television episodes
Westworld (TV series) episodes